Générargues is a commune in the Gard department in southern France, around 10 km southwest of Alès.

Geography

Climate

Générargues has a hot-summer Mediterranean climate (Köppen climate classification Csa).

Population

See also
 Bambouseraie de Prafrance
 Communes of the Gard department

References

Communes of Gard